The Meowstro Sings — Guster's Keep It Together is an album created by the band Guster. It features all but one of the tracks from their release Keep It Together, with the vocals replaced by simulated cat meows.  According to the band, the meows were sung by Guster's monitor engineer at the time, Matt Peskie. The tracks were then released to Kazaa, in an effort to deter downloading of legitimate tracks.

The "meow mixes" gained a following from some fans, and were made available to Keep It Together purchasers through a link hidden on that album. It is still available from iTunes.

Other Meowstro appearances
The Meowstro is featured in "Melanie", which appeared on the 2004 Guster album Live 6/17/04 Myrtle Beach, SC. The studio version of "Melanie" appearing on the band's Goldfly album also includes some meowing, but not by the Meowstro.

Guster released the single "Carol of the Meows" for the 2004 holiday season, a recording of the traditional "Carol of the Bells" given the same treatment.

Track listing
"Diane" (Meow Mix) – 3:51
"Amsterdam" (Meow Mix) – 3:39
"Homecoming King" (Meow Mix) – 3:43
"Jesus on the Radio" (Meow Mix) – 2:22
"Come Downstairs and Say Hello" (Meow Mix) – 5:24
"Keep It Together" (Meow Mix) – 3:43
"Long Way Down" (Meow Mix) – 4:42
"Backyard" (Meow Mix) – 3:07
"Red Oyster Cult" (Meow Mix) – 3:31
"Ramona" (Meow Mix) – 3:05
"Careful" (Meow Mix) – 3:44
"I Hope Tomorrow Is Like Today" (Meow Mix) – 3:20

See also
 Duetto buffo di due gatti
 "Duo miaulé"  in L'enfant et les sortilèges

Notes

External links
 Guster Player includes "Carol of the Meows"; the Goldfly version of "Melanie" is found under the "Sonic Archives" link. (requires Adobe Flash Player)

Guster albums
2003 remix albums
Reprise Records remix albums
Albums produced by Roger Moutenot
Zoomusicology